Miss America 1962, the 35th Miss America pageant, was held at the Boardwalk Hall in Atlantic City, New Jersey on September 9, 1961, and was broadcast on CBS.

According to Nielsen ratings, the pageant is the highest rated Miss America telecast on record. It is also ranked among the top 100 television events of all time. Maria Fletcher became the first entry representing North Carolina to win the crown.

Results

Order of announcements

Top 10

Top 5

Awards

Preliminary awards

Other awards

Contestants

References

External links
 Miss America official website

1962
1961 in the United States
1962 beauty pageants
1961 in New Jersey
September 1961 events in the United States
Events in Atlantic City, New Jersey